Fransen is a Dutch patronymic surname meaning "son of Frans". It can refer to:

 Frederic J. Fransen (born 1965), American philanthropy consultant
 Isaäc Dignus Fransen van de Putte (1822-1902), Dutch politician
 Jayda Fransen (born 1986), English Fascist politician
 Joeri Fransen (born 1981), Belgian pop singer
 Lieve Fransen (born 1950), Belgian civil servant and health activist
 Piet Fransen (born 1936), Dutch footballer
 Remona Fransen (born 1985), Dutch athlete
 Roy Fransen (1916-1985), English high diver and stuntman
 Stephan Fransen (born 1988), Dutch tennis player

See also
Franssen, Dutch surname

Dutch-language surnames
Patronymic surnames
Surnames from given names

de:Fransen
nl:Fransen